She Gets Her Man is a 1945 American comedy film directed by Erle C. Kenton and written by Warren Wilson, Clyde Bruckman, Ray Singer and Dick Chevillat. The film stars Joan Davis, William Gargan, Leon Errol, Vivian Austin, Milburn Stone and Russell Hicks. The film was released on January 12, 1945, by Universal Pictures.

Plot

Cast        
Joan Davis as Jane 'Pilky' Pilkington
William Gargan as 'Breezy' Barton
Leon Errol as Mulligan
Vivian Austin as Maybelle Clark
Milburn Stone as 'Tommy Gun' Tucker
Russell Hicks as Mayor
Donald MacBride as Henry Wright
Paul Stanton as Dr. Bleaker
Cy Kendall as Brodie
Emmett Vogan as Hatch
Eddie Acuff as Boze
Virginia Sale as Phoebe
Ian Keith as Oliver McQuestion
Maurice Cass as Mr. Pudge
Chester Clute as Charlie
Arthur Loft as Waldron
Sidney Miller as Boy
Leslie Denison as Barnsdale
Al Kikume as Joe
Robert Allen as Band Leader / Singer

References

External links
 

1945 films
American comedy films
1945 comedy films
Universal Pictures films
Films directed by Erle C. Kenton
American black-and-white films
1940s English-language films
1940s American films